The 1906 Rutgers Queensmen football team represented Rutgers University as an independent during the 1906 college football season. In their first season under head coach Frank Gorton, the Queensmen compiled a 5–2–2 record and outscored their opponents, 123 to 30. The team captain was Douglas J. Fisher.

Schedule

References

Rutgers
Rutgers Scarlet Knights football seasons
Rutgers Queensmen football